Myozenin-2, also referred to as Calsarcin-1, is a protein that in humans is encoded by the MYOZ2 gene. The Calsarcin-1 isoform is a muscle protein expressed in cardiac muscle and slow-twitch skeletal muscle, which functions to tether calcineurin to alpha-actinin at Z-discs, and inhibit the pathological cardiac hypertrophic response. This differs from the fast-skeletal muscle isoform, calsarcin-2.

Structure 

Calsarcin-1 is a 29.9 kDa protein composed of 264 amino acids. Calsarcin-1 and calsarcin-2 are only 31% homologous (94 identical amino acids), exhibiting the highest homology at N- and C-termini. Calsarcin-1 binds to alpha-actinin, gamma-filamin,  telethonin, ZASP/Cypher and calcineurin. The binding region of calsarcin-1 to alpha-actinin is localized to amino acids 153-200, and that of calsarcin-1 to calcineurin is amino acids 217-240.

Function 
The function of calsarcin-1 in cardiac and slow-skeletal muscle has been illuminated through studies in transgenic animals. Mice lacking the MYOZ2 gene (MYOZ2-/-) are generally sensitized to calcineurin signaling in both muscle types. In slow-skeletal muscle, MYOZ2-/- show increased slow-twitch muscle fibers. In cardiac, MYOZ2-/- show induction of the fetal gene program typical of pathologic hypertrophy, however there was no evidence of hypertrophied morphometry at baseline. However, upon calcineurin activation or pressure overload-induced pathologic hypertrophy, MYOZ2-/- exhibited exaggerated cardiac hypertrophy, demonstrating that calsarcin-1 negatively modulates the function of calcineurin during pathologic hypertrophic remodeling. Additional studies supported these findings in demonstrating that adenoviral overexpression of calsarcin-1 attenuated Gq alpha subunit-stimuated hypertrophy and ANP induction, by Angiotensin II, phenylephrine and endothelin-1 agonists in neonatal cardiomyocytes. Overexpression of calsarcin-1 in mice (CS1Tg) was protective against Angiotensin II-induced pathologic cardiac hypertrophy, evidenced by preserved fractional shortening and contractility, as well as a blunted induction of the fetal hypertrophic gene program and significantly reduced expression of calcineurin-stimulated MCIP1.4 gene expression. Taken together, these studies strongly support a role for calsarcin-1 in suppressing pathologic cardiac hypertrophy.

Clinical Significance
Two missense mutations in MYOZ2, Ser48Pro and Ile246Met, have been shown to be causal for rare forms of familial hypertrophic cardiomyopathy.

References

Further reading

External links 
 Mass spectrometry characterization of human MYOZ2 at COPaKB